Otylia Tabacka-Kałuża (23 May 1907 – 23 October 1981) was a Polish middle-distance runner. She competed in the women's 800 metres at the 1928 Summer Olympics.

References

External links
 

1907 births
1981 deaths
Athletes (track and field) at the 1928 Summer Olympics
Polish female middle-distance runners
Olympic athletes of Poland
Place of birth missing
People from Mikołów County
20th-century Polish women